Apogon semiornatus, the oblique-banded cardinalfish, is a translucent fish with one main stripe (usually red) and little to no smaller stripes; stripe-free individuals have also been found. This fish lives in the Indo-West Pacific Ocean, in the Red Sea and the Gulf of Oman, east to Australia, north to Japan, south to Natal, and in the waters around South Africa. This fish naturally lives in rocky and rubble reefs and displays secretive behavior by preferring to remain under pieces of material or in the back of low caves. These fish can live alone but are sometimes found in small groups.

Information
 Hardness: Intermediate
 Light Level: Dim/Minimum 
 Temperature Range: 20°C-26°C
 Minimum Tank Size: 350 Liters
 Depth Range: 5-30m
 Diet: Carnivore, Vitamin Enriched Tablets, Frozen Food, Flake Food 
 Maximum Size: 7 cm
 Aquarium Occurrence: Rare

References

  Meerwasser's Information
  Searchfish's Information
  Saltcorner's Information

semiornatus
Fish described in 1876
Taxa named by Wilhelm Peters